A list of windmills in Leicestershire.

Mills in bold are still standing, known building dates are indicated in bold. Text in italics denotes indicates that the information is not confirmed, but is likely to be the case stated.

Locations

A - C

E - G

H - K

L

M - R

S - W

Locations formerly in Leicestershire

Maps
1779 John Prior
1826 Greenwood
1828 Ellis

References

Windmills in Leicestershire
Lists of windmills in England
Windmills